Rezavieh (also Romanized as Rez̤avīeh; also known as Qal‘eh Sīāh) is a village in Miyan Velayat Rural District, in the Central District of Mashhad County, Razavi Khorasan Province, Iran. At the 2006 census, its population was 596, in 132 families.

References 

Populated places in Mashhad County